Dragovo (Cyrillic: Драгово) may refer to:

 Dragovo, Bulgaria, a village in Burgas Province, Bulgaria
 Dragovo (Serbia), a village in Serbia